Peninsula Community Church (formerly Abundant Life Centre) is a Christian church. The church is located in Dee Why, a northern suburb of Sydney, Australia, in the local government area of the Warringah Shire. The church's pastors are Roy and Gae Barrett, who started the church, along with 5 other people in 1996.

History
In 2009 the church undertook a building project which consisted of converting a property in Brookvale into a 175-seat church auditorium, offices and associated ministry rooms for creche, children and youth. The building renovations and DA approval took 4 months to complete.

In 2017, Peninsula Church restructured to one monthly combined service held in Dee Why on the first Sunday of every month; combined with weekly home church meetings on weeks 2, 3 and 4. This model promotes greater personal responsibility for members to participate in all aspects of the weekly church service. Church Members meet in multiple locations all across the Northern Beaches each week. There are currently 8 mid-week church services running.  2 locations on a Sunday Morning, Sunday Night, Tuesday Night, Wednesday Night, Thursday Morning and Saturday Night. Visitors are encouraged to first attend a Combined Sunday Service where they can find out more and get introduced to a weekly group.

Media
Peninsula Church's Sunday services are available to watch online  or list to on podcast

References

Association of Vineyard Churches
Pentecostal churches in Sydney
Churches completed in 1996
1996 establishments in Australia